Letelier is a surname. Notable people with the surname include:

Carmen Luisa Letelier, Chilean singer and teacher
Fabiola Letelier (born 1929), Chilean lawyer
Hernán Rivera Letelier (born 1950), Chilean novelist
José Letelier (born 1966), Chilean football coach and goalkeeper
Juan Carlos Letelier (born 1959), Chilean football striker
Patricio Letelier (1943–2011), Chilean mathematical physicist 
Orlando Letelier (1932–1976), Chilean economist, politician and diplomat 
René Letelier (1915–2006), Chilean chess player